Teng Daiyuan (November 2, 1904 – December 1, 1974) was a military leader of the People's Liberation Army, a senior leader of the Communist Party of China, and a politician of the People's Republic of China.

Teng belonged to Miao people and was born in Mayang, Hunan.

After formation of the People's Republic of China, Teng served as the first Minister of Railways. He was persecuted in the Cultural Revolution and died on December 1, 1974 in Beijing, at the age of 70.

Teng was the founder of railway infrastructure and the railway army of PRC.

1904 births
1974 deaths
People's Republic of China politicians from Hunan
Chinese Communist Party politicians from Hunan
Politicians from Huaihua
Vice Chairpersons of the National Committee of the Chinese People's Political Consultative Conference
Hmong politicians
Victims of the Cultural Revolution